is a passenger railway station located in the town of Aizumi, Itano District, Tokushima Prefecture, Japan. It is operated by JR Shikoku and has the station number "T03".

Lines
Shōzui Station is served by the JR Shikoku Kōtoku Line and is located 66.9 km from the beginning of the line at Takamatsu. These trains also stop at Shōzui.

Layout
The station consists of two side platforms serving two tracks. Track 2 is the through-track while track 1 is a passing loop. A station building houses a waiting room and a JR ticket window (without a Midori no Madoguchi facility), open for limited hours only. Access to the opposite platform is by means of a footbridge but a level crossing with ramps leading up to the platforms is also available. Parking is available at the station forecourt and there is a two-storey garage for the parking of bicycles.

Platforms

History
Shōzui Station was opened by the privately run Awa Electric Railway (later the Awa Railway) on 1 July 1916. After the Awa Railway was nationalized on 1 July 1933, Japanese Government Railways (JGR) took over control of the station and operated it as part of the Awa Line. On 20 March 1935, the station became part of the Kōtoku Main Line. With the privatization of JNR on 1 April 1987, the station came under the control of JR Shikoku.

Passenger statistics
In fiscal 2019, the station was used by an average of 1215 passengers daily

Surrounding area
Tokushima Prefectural Tokushima Kita High School
Shōzui Castle ruins

See also
List of railway stations in Japan

References

External links

JR Shikoku timetable

Railway stations in Tokushima Prefecture
Railway stations in Japan opened in 1916
Aizumi, Tokushima